HD 38529 b is an extrasolar planet approximately 138 light years away in the constellation of Orion. This planet was discovered in 2000.  Because of its mass, it is likely that it is a gas giant.

Notes

References

External links 

Orion (constellation)
Exoplanets discovered in 2000
Giant planets
Exoplanets detected by radial velocity